Angelo Martinetti (1830, Rome) was an Italian painter, mainly of still-lives depicting game.

Biography
He was the brother of the controversial antiquarian and numismatist, Francesco Martinetti (1833 – 1895). He exhibited paintings of game in many exhibitions, including in Turin in 1880 and at Rome in 1883.

References

1830 births
Painters from Rome
19th-century Italian painters
Italian male painters
Year of death missing
19th-century Italian male artists